GOODS-N-774 also called "Sparky", is a distant early galaxy which is in the process of core formation. The galaxy is massive and extremely compact, forming stars furiously. It is thought to be on its way to becoming a giant elliptical galaxy. This galaxy was discovered in 2014, and is some 11 billion light years distant. In the sky, it is located in the constellation of Ursa Major. It is the first discovered galaxy in this stage of giant galaxy formation.

Characteristics
Sparky is forming stars at a rate of 300 stars per year, compared to our Milky Way's rate of 10. And GOODS-N-774, at 1.0×1011MSun, is around twice as massive as the Milky Way Galaxy. The amount of star formation and related high concentrations of gas and dust obscure the view of the galaxy, making it hard to detect. The ferocious rate of star formation is thought to be the result of the dark matter halo drawing great amounts of intergalactic gas into the core, fuelling the continuous starburst, of 1 billion years. The galaxy does not contain an active galactic nucleus, confounding some expectations.

See also
 List of galaxies
 List of nearest galaxies
 List of spiral galaxies

References

Further reading

External links
 ESA/Hubble, "Distant galaxy core in the Hubble GOODS North field", NASA, ESA, and E. Nelson (Yale University, USA) 27 August 2014 ; (accessed 14-09-14)
 Hubblesite, "NASA Telescopes Help Uncover Early Construction Phase of Giant Galaxy", 27 August 2014, (STScI-2014-37), NASA
 phys.org, "Witnessing the early growth of a giant", 27 August 2014 (with video) 
 Nature, "Structural properties of GOODS-N-774", (with PowerPoint) (accessed 09-14-14)

Protogalaxies
Ursa Major (constellation)